Laterrière is a community in the Saguenay–Lac-Saint-Jean region of Quebec and a former municipality. It is part of the merged city of Saguenay, Quebec. Laterrière was founded by Jean-Baptiste Honorat
in 1846.

References

External links 
Mémoires d'un village : Laterrière, Saguenay, 1900–1960. Livre disponible, en texte intégral, dans Les Classiques des sciences sociales, avec l'autorisation de l'auteur. 

Neighbourhoods in Saguenay, Quebec
Former municipalities in Quebec
Former cities in Quebec